The Dolphin South End Runners (DSE) is the oldest and largest running club in San Francisco, founded in 1966, by the legendary and infamous Walt Stack who was also its first president. DSE holds organized races nearly every weekend in and around San Francisco. These races are low key and open to runners and walkers of all ages and abilities.

The DSE has been named BEST Running Club in the 2009 Mind & Body contest on the BayList on SFGate.com.

References

External links
Official DSE site
DSE Facebook page

Organizations established in 1966
Sports organizations based in San Francisco
Road running in the United States
Running clubs in the United States
1966 establishments in California